Phytoecia sublateralis is a species of beetle in the family Cerambycidae. It was described by Stephan von Breuning in 1950.

References

Phytoecia
Beetles described in 1950